Baladevjew Temple is situated in Ichhapur (Tulasi Khetra), Kendrapara, Odisha, India. Baladevjew Temple is a very famous temple of Odisha and Balarama is its main divinity. However, Jagannath and Subhadra are also worshipped in the Ratna Sinhasan (Gem Throne) in the main temple. An idol representing tulasi as a goddess in a seated position is also present after the sacred seven steps.

History 
The present shrine of Siddha Baladevajew was constructed during the Maratha rule in Odisha (1761 AD) of Ichhapur (Kendrapara). It was constructed by the king of Kujanga, Raja Gopal Sandha and Zamindar (landlord) of Chhedara killah, Srinivas Narendra Mahapatra. One saint (Santha) Gopi Das and Sairatak Giri convinced the then Maratha Chief Janoji and constructed the Jagamohan, Bhoga Mandapa of the main temple, temple of Gundicha and compound wall.

It is believed that Khan-I-Duran, the subedar of Odisha during the Mughal Emperor Aurangzeb demolished the temple in 1661 and built a mosque on the remains of the temple. Devotees of Lord Baladev Jeu, took the deity in disguise in a boat through the river Govari and kept the deity in a secret place near Baranga (Chhedara) Jungle. Afterwards it was shifted to Balarampur village near Luna river at Sakhi Bata. Later it was transferred to the present day Icchapur temple.

Architecture and construction of Baladevjew Temple
There are 2 parts in the total area. In one part, different temples are there and the other part is a garden.

There are four main parts of Baladevjew Temple are
Bada Deula or Sri Mandir
Majhi Mandir or Bhog Mandap
Jagamohan or Natya Mandir
Bata Mandir or Mukhashala
The main temple has a 7 step construction and heavy baulamalia stone are used in this construction. There are other small temples inside the premise, where other Gods and Goddesses are worshipped. All the temples have beautiful architecture and are constructed in traditional way.

The other important parts of the temple are Garuda Stambha, Ratna Bhandar, Snana Mandap, Mukti Mandap, Jhulan Gruha, Laxmi Mandira, Anand Bazar, Bhairabi Mandir, NabaGraha Mandir, Kasi Biswonath, Astasambhu Mahadev, Sri Ram mandir, Sidheswar Mahadev, Mukti Mandap, Ganesh mandir, & adhistati Devi Tulasi Temple

Rituals
The deities of Lord Baladevjew, Lord Jagannath and Goddess Subhadra wear different costumes and are decorated in different ways during different important festivals. This tradition is known as Besha (alankara). The Rath Yatra here  is famous for the Brahma Taladhwaja Rath.

Some important alankara are
 Sri Raghunatha Besha on Chaitra Purnima Festival
 Padma Besha on Kartik Purnima Festival and Tulsi Vivah in Kartik
 Gamhabhisheka Besha – From Shraavana Sukla Dashami to Purnima, holy srinakshatra ceremony of Lord Balarama
 Pushyabhisheka Besha on Pausha Purnima festival
 Kanchi Kaveri Besha on Vasant Panchami festival
 Suna Besha (Bali Vamana Besha) on Bhadrapad Dwadashi Day
 Krishna Balarama Besha on Phalguna Purnima festival
 Dwibinda banara besha that was offered by Pandit Binod Behari Dash who was a famous Sanskrit scholar of Ichhapur, Kendrapada

Offerings

There are arrangements for three main Naivedya offerings (Dhupa) and 3 minor offerings (Abakasha) for the deities daily.
 Morning offering (Sakala Dhupa)
 Offering at pre-noon (Madhhyanna Dhupa)
 Rice offering ( Dwiprahara Dhupa/ Anna Dhupa)
 Offering at evening ( Sandhya Aarati Dhupa)
 Rice offering ( Nisankhudi Dhupa)
 Offering at night ( Badasinghar Dhupa)

Different types of offerings (prasad) are made with trained traditional families, called as Supakara and Mekap are engaged solely for deities. Some of the delicacies are highly patronized in different historic regimes. A comprehensive list of the delicacies is given below.

Baula Gaintha, Upana Pitha, Mithei, Chaurashi Vyanjana(84 vegetable Curry), Makara Chaula, Bhaja, Ghia Anna, Dali, Phalamula (fruits and roots), Dry sweets, Ghanavarta, Pura Kakara, Rasabali, Putuli Pitha, Chipa Kakara, Karanji, Khaja, Magaja Ladoo, Dalimba, Khuduma, Nishkudi, Mutha Gaja, Tala, Chhena Chakata are the famous ones.

Notes

References

External links
 http://www.baladevjew.webs.com
 report on Baldeva temple
 panorama of sculptures in Baladeva temple, Ichhapur
 History of destruction

Vishnu temples
Kendrapara district
Hindu temples in Odisha
1761 establishments in India